A complex is a structure in the unconscious that is objectified as an underlying theme—like a power or a status—by grouping clusters of emotions, memories, perceptions and wishes in response to a threat to the stability of the self. In psychoanalysis, it is antithetical to drives.

Overview 

An example of a complex would be as follows: if a person had a leg amputated when a child, this would influence the person's life in profound ways, even upon overcoming the physical handicap. The person may have many thoughts, emotions, memories, feelings of inferiority, triumphs, bitterness, and determinations centering on that one aspect of life. If these thoughts were troubling and pervasive, Jung might say the person had a "complex" about the leg.

The reality of complexes is widely agreed upon in the area of depth psychology, a branch of psychology asserting that the vast majority of the personality is determined and influenced by unconscious processes. Complexes are common features of the psychic landscape, according to Jung's accounting of the psyche, and often become relevant in psychotherapy to examine and resolve, most especially in the journey toward individuation or wholeness. Without resolution, complexes continue to exert unconscious, maladaptive influence on our thoughts, feelings, and behavior and keep us from achieving psychological integration.

History and development of the idea 

Carl Jung distinguished between two types of unconscious mind: the personal unconscious and collective unconscious. The personal unconscious was the accumulation of experiences from a person's lifetime that could not be consciously recalled. The collective unconscious, on the other hand, was a sort of universal inheritance of human beings, a "species memory" passed on to each of us, not unlike the motor programs and instincts of other animals. Jung believed the personal unconscious was dominated by complexes.

The term complex (also emotionally charged complexes or feeling-toned complex of ideas), was coined by Carl Jung when he was still a close associate of Sigmund Freud. Complexes were so central to Jung's ideas that he originally called his body of theories Complex psychology.  Historically the term originated with Theodor Ziehen, a German psychiatrist who experimented with reaction time in word association test responses. Jung described a complex as a node in the unconscious; it may be imagined as a knot of unconscious feelings and beliefs, detectable indirectly, through behavior that is puzzling or hard to account for.

Jung developed his theory regarding complexes very early in his career through the word association tests conducted at the Burghölzli, the psychiatric clinic of Zurich University, where he worked from 1900 to 1908. In the word association tests, a researcher would read a list of 100 words to a subject, who was asked to say, as quickly as possible, the first thing that came to mind in response to each word, and the subject's reaction time was measured in fifths of a second. (Sir Francis Galton invented the method in 1879.) Researchers noted any unusual reactions—hesitations, slips of the tongue, signs of emotion. Jung was interested in patterns he detected in subjects' responses, hinting at unconscious feelings and beliefs.

In Jung's theory, complexes may be conscious, partly conscious, or unconscious. As well, complexes can be positive or negative, resulting in good or bad consequences. There are many kinds of them, but at the core of any complex is a universal pattern of experience, or archetype. Two of the major complexes Jung wrote about were the anima (a node of unconscious beliefs and feelings in a man's psyche relating to the opposite gender) and animus (the corresponding complex in a woman's psyche). Other major complexes include the mother, father, hero, and more recently, the brother and sister. Jung believed it was perfectly normal to have complexes because everyone has emotional experiences that affect the psyche. Although they are normal, negative complexes can cause us pain and suffering.

One of the key differences between Jungian and Freudian theory is that Jung's thought posits several different kinds of complex. Freud only focused on the Oedipus complex which reflected developmental challenges that face every young boy. He did not take other complexes into account except for the Electra complex, which he briefly spoke of.

After years of working together, Jung broke from Freud, due to disagreements in their ideas, and they each developed their own theories. Jung wanted to distinguish between his and Freud's findings, so he named his theory "analytical psychology".

Jung's theory of complexes with key citations

The ego itself can be thought of as a complex, not yet fully integrated with other parts of the psyche (namely, the superego and the id, or unconscious). As described by Jung, "by ego I understand a complex of ideas which constitutes the center of my field of consciousness and appears to possess a high degree of continuity and identity. Hence I also speak of an ego-complex".

Jung often used the term complex to describe a partially repressed, yet highly influential cluster of charged psychic material split off from, or at odds with, the conscious "I". Daniels described complexes in 2010 as "'stuck-together' agglomerations of thoughts, feelings, behavior patterns, and somatic forms of expression". Concerning its nature as feeling-toned, Jung wrote "[a complex] is the image of a certain psychic situation which is strongly accentuated emotionally and is, moreover, incompatible with the habitual attitude of consciousness. This image has a powerful inner coherence, it has its own wholeness and, in addition, a relatively high degree of autonomy, so that it is subject to the control of the conscious mind to only a limited extent, and therefore behaves like an animated foreign body in the sphere of consciousness."

Some complexes can usurp power from the ego and can cause psychological disturbances and symptoms resulting from the development of a neurosis. Jung described the autonomous, self-directing nature of complexes when he said 

On the other hand, Jung spoke of the "differentiating functions" as essentially the healthy development of useful complexes, yet not without bringing about often undesirable side effects.

In Psychological Types, Jung describes the effects of tensions between the dominant and inferior differentiating functions, often forming complexes and neuroses, in high and even extremely one-sided types.

In archetypal psychology

Suffering contains complexes; complexes contain archetypes; archetypes contain the myths of deities; this figurative analogy is used to understand the afflicted subject.

Complexes and subpersonalities
Jung conceptualized complexes as having a high degree of autonomy, describing them as ‘splinter psyches’ that form the basis for ‘mini-personalities’, whom he called the ‘little people’.
This provided the foundation for later expansion of the idea, most notably by British Psychotherapist John Rowan, who referred to them as subpersonalities, each one operating as a 'semipermanent and semi-autonomous region of the personality capable of acting as a person'.

The work of Rowan and others led to the widespread use of techniques by which psychotherapists encourage clients to express the thoughts, feelings, and attitudes of their various subpersonalities, as a way of facilitating the integration of diverse characteristics, part of what Jung called individuation.

Examples

See also

 View (Buddhism)
 Family romance
 Freudian psychology
 Jungian psychology
 Condensation (psychology)
 Anima and animus

References

Bibliography

 
 
 
 
 
 
 
 
 
 

 
Psychoanalytic terminology
Analytical psychology
Freudian psychology